Ruski Tyshky is a village in Ukraine in Kharkiv Raion, Kharkiv Oblast, at about  northeast from the centre of Kharkiv city. The village borders in the south-west with the village of Cherkaski Tyshky. It belongs to Tsyrkuny rural hromada, one of the hromadas of Ukraine.

Ruski Tyshky came under attack of the Russian forces around the spring of 2022, during the Russian invasion of Ukraine.

Geography
Ruski Tyshky is located on the banks of the Kharkiv river at the confluence of the Murom river (left tributary), 1.5 km upstream is the village of Borshchova, and downstream is the village of Cherkaski Tyshky. The dam of the Muroms'ke Reservoir is located 2 km upstream of the Murom river.

References

Villages in Kharkiv Raion